Rameses Revenge was a Top Spin ride at Chessington World of Adventures Resort theme park in southwest London, England, introduced in 1995. It was the world's first top spin ride to feature a drown-upside-down element.

History and operation

Rameses Revenge was manufactured by Huss Rides, a German company who had previously made Chessington's Black Buccaneer ride. It was one of the first top spin flat rides built to feature water fountains, which spray riders at certain points in the ride cycle. Introduced from June 1995, Rameses Revenge was the main focus of advertising for Chessington World of Adventures Resort in that year, and was also widely featured in the British media, even being featured in its own segment by the ITV Evening News.

It is situated in the Egyptian themed Forbidden Kingdom area of the park. Rameses Revenge was refurbished in 2007, with new settings placed onto the ride's PLC to improve ride-ability.

The ride is surrounded by buildings resembling a traditional Arabic market town, while the ride itself is built into a pit. The ride was re-branded with a new colour scheme and logo in 2000.

The ride entrance was relocated in 2015 and the queue was shortened.

Removal
Rameses Revenge closed to the public on 3 November 2019 and was removed from Chessington shortly before the beginning of 2020, with a crocodile-themed drop tower ride named Croc Drop being its now existing replacement. This means that there are no more permanent HUSS Top Spins in the UK, just travelling ones.

Incidents
On 23 July 2011 40 guests were trapped upside down when the ride stopped due to a technical issue, after a few seconds, the safety system activated, lowering riders to ground level. It then took a further 20 minutes to release them. 6 people were treated by emergency services for asthma and panic attacks. Subsequently, the ride was closed for the rest of the year.

Gallery

See also

Chessington World of Adventures Resort

References

External links

1995 establishments in England
2019 disestablishments in England
Chessington World of Adventures past rides
Amusement rides manufactured by HUSS Park Attractions
Amusement rides introduced in 1995
Buildings and structures demolished in 2019